Fluxx is a card game, played with a specially designed deck published by Looney Labs. It is different from most other card games, in that the rules and the conditions for winning are altered throughout the game, via cards played by the players.

History
The original print run was for 5,000 units and was released in 1997.

The game was successful and was licensed a year later to Iron Crown Enterprises (ICE) for wider distribution. ICE went bankrupt two years later and Looney Labs resumed publication and distribution. By , Labs was considering putting out another standalone deck version called Fluxx++ using card created by the Fluxx playing community with Fluxx Blanxx and Fluxx: Goals Galore, an expansion consisting of goal cards, based on its Origins 2000 5 Goal cards promo pack.

In 2003, Amigo Games, a German game company, licensed and published a German language version of Fluxx. Looney Labs registered the Fluxx trademark. By , Stoner Fluxx had been released and EcoFluxx was in play testing, and scheduled to be released later that month followed by Family Fluxx.

In , Looney Labs issued a Spanish language edition of the game. The  release of a zombie-themed version brought the first of a new card type, the Creeper and Ungoal. In 2008, Toy Vault and Looney Labs co-published and released Monty Python Fluxx.

In 2008, Zombie Fluxx won the Origins Award for Traditional Card Game of the Year. Stoner Fluxx was placed back in print under the Full Baked Ideas imprint of Looney Labs on  after being out of print for four years. Full Baked was launched with expectation of a future release of a drinking variant and other mature subject versions.

In , the Surprise subtype of cards were introduced in the Pirate Fluxx themed variant. In , the German language version 2nd edition was released by Pegasus Games. By  over 1 million decks of all Fluxx versions had been sold while Pirate Fluxx was getting into bookstores that month.

On , Looney Labs got a simplified, less expensive general market version with redesigned packaging of Fluxx into Target stores. For the summer 2012, Fluxx was number 10 in ICv2's Top 10 Card/Building Games (hobby channel).

A Cartoon Network version of the game was made available as a Target exclusive from mid-August 2014 until Easter 2015, while in July the Regular Show Fluxx was released to the hobby market. The fifth edition of the regular Fluxx game was made available beginning in 2014 as the 4.0 edition ran out. Looney Labs teamed up with The Doubleclicks for a Fluxx theme song.

A new expansion of the game, Fluxx Dice, plus two new licensed variants were scheduled to be released in the summer of 2015. With a delay of the first variant to be released at the polled requested of the retailers, Looney Labs pushed back the dice and the other variant to stagger the releases to spread out the impact.

A series of educational variants were released in 2017 and 2018. In partnership with Gale Force 9, two Fluxx versions of Star Trek were released in August 2018.

Game description and play
The first edition deck consists of 84 cards with four types of cards: Keepers, Goals, Actions, and New Rules. While the game begins by requiring players to simply draw and play a specific number of cards, the mechanic mutates when a New Rule card is played. The card may change the number of cards drawn or played per turn, the number of cards held per hand, or the Keepers played. The Goal cards change the Keepers needed to win the game. Games last from 5 to 30 minutes.

Later sets sometimes included new card subtypes, depending on the theme of the set. These include included Creeper cards that block or make goals more difficult to obtain; Ungoal cards, which have conditions where the game ends with no winner; and Surprise cards, a 2011 addition, which allow players to negate other types of cards which could prevent a victory and can be played at any time, though they have other effects when played on one's own turn.

The first Fluxx tournament at Origins 1997 had an extra rule calling for an increase in the Basic Rules each time the deck was reshuffled which was kept for future tournaments. On  via their Wunderland blog, Looney introduced "Meta Rule" cards for players to print at home and add to standard decks or place in the primary deck Edition 4.0.

Early edition decks had 84 cards while newer standard decks have 100 cards, while Lite versions (Family, Spanish, SE) consist of 56 cards.

Card sets

Editions

 Fluxx 1.0 (1997) first released version; monochrome, poker-sized cards
 Fluxx 2.0 (1998) published by Iron Crown Enterprises; new card layout, use of color, bridge-sized cards
 Fluxx 2.1 (2002) reprint of 2.0 with minor changes
 Fluxx 3.0 (many cards removed and added, to improve balance) manufactured by Cartamundi
 Fluxx 3.1 new style Basic Rule card, two cards removed, one card added; manufactured by Cartamundi
 Fluxx 4.0 card number increased to 100, all color, introduction of Meta rule in any set and creepers in primary editions
 Fluxx SE a Target Stores exclusive "basic entry" edition of the game, with simplified rules and exclusive cards, manufactured by 360 Manufacturing
 Fluxx 5.0 (2014) removal of all creepers and several other cards, 17 total, replaced by new Keepers, Goals, Actions, and New Rules cards

Languages
 Fluxx Spanish (Fluxx Español!) Looney Labs, a 56 card set with 6 new Goals, a new Keeper and a new Rule
 German Fluxx first edition (2003; based on 3.0 card set) by Amigo Games
Second edition (based on 4.0 card set) Pegasus Games
 Japanese Fluxx  (based on 3.0 card set) HobbyJapan
 Dutch Fluxx (based on 5.0 card set) PS Games
 Portuguese EcoFluxx, released in Brazil
 Italian, released in Italy

Variants

There are also versions of Fluxx that have been released using entirely different themed sets of cards while playing by the same set of rules.

 EcoFluxx, a percentage of profits goes toward environmental causes 
 First edition (October 2005) Allison Frane art 84 cards
 Second edition added additional cards including Creeper cards and has new art; 100 cards
 Nature renamed third edition of EcoFluxx with update cards and packaging & continuing its donation to its eco-causes
 Zombie 2008 Origins Award for Traditional Card Game of the Year, introduced the Creeper type card, 100 cards
 Monty Python co-published with Monty Python licensee, Toy Vault; 100 cards with Todd Cameron Hamilton art
 Martian 
 Pirate introduces the Surprise cards
 Star (STARFLUXX, styled like STAR WARS, with space theme)()
 Oz Fluxx()
 Cthulhu
Fluxx the Boardgame Parents' Choice Recommended Seal Fall 2013 Games
Monster (Fall ) also a Target Stores exclusive, manufactured by 360 Manufacturing
Regular Show 100 cards - out of print 
Cartoon Network (mid-) also a Target Stores exclusive 
Holiday Fluxx 100 cards with art by Ali Douglass
Adventure Time 
Batman with Cryptozoic Entertainment
Firefly Fluxx 20th Century Fox and Gale Force Nine
Doctor Who  (November 23, 2017)
 Star Trek: The Original Series with Gale Force 9
 Star Trek: The Next Generation with Gale Force 9
 Fairy Tale art by Mary Engelbreit
 Star Trek: Deep Space Nine (May 23, 2019)
Marvel – Specialty Edition (August 15, 2019) with Cardinal Industries, who releases the regular edition sans the extras; includes 7 exclusive cards, and a collectible coin
Jumanji  – Specialty Edition (August 15, 2019) with Cardinal Industries, who releases the regular edition sans the extras; includes 7 exclusive cards, and a collectible coin; adds a "Danger" type cards that can eliminate players with the ability to return unless the deck then elimination is permanent
SpongeBob SquarePants (May 21, 2020)
Fantasy Fluxx (January 2021)
Fluxx Remixx (March 2022), A version of Fluxx 5.0 with "remixed" goals, rules and actions, alongside the original keepers.

Fully Baked Ideas imprint
 Stoner 2nd Edition  with 5% of proceeds going to end cannabis prohibition groups; 100 cards
Drinking ''' (July 24, 2017)

Educational setsMathChemistryAnatomy (April 5, 2018)Astronomy (January 9, 2020)

Many of the version can be combined with each other to make a "mega Fluxx" deck (as all these versions have the same card back style).

Expansions
Several expansions have been produced, including:
 Fluxx Blanxx, a set of blank cards for creating one's own custom additions (see above).
2nd edition - begins formatted fronts while including the Chrononauts Beatles Reunion CD card
3rd edition - adds Creeper blanks while removing the Chrononauts card
 Jewish Christian Castle Expansion Cards ( for Monty Python Fluxx
 7 Cards From the Future (a 7-card set for Regular Show Fluxx)International Tabletop Day Expansion: Wil Wheaton and Felicia Day Fluxx Promo Packs (April 11, 2015)
 Fluxx Dice
 Star Trek Fluxx Bridge Expansion (August 2018) used to play both Star Trek & Star Trek TNG Fluxx together at the same time
 Firefly Fluxx Upgrade Pack (August 2018) 10 card pack includes Jubal Early, Hands of Blue, upgraded Reavers and Yolanda (aka Saffron, aka Bridgett)
 Black Knight Expansion  (August 2018) a 10 card pack including the Black Knight as a Creeper, also Tim the Enchanter, new rules and a new Quest 
 Fluxx Creeper Pack (August 2018) To bring back the Creepers  dropped for edition 5, War, Death, Taxes, and Radioactive Potato with Goals, Actions and New Rules
 The Doctor Who Fluxx 13th Doctor Pack (Mid-year 2019)

This game was awarded the Parents' Choice Recommended Seal Fall 2013 for Games.

The game moves the Keeper card items to spaces on the board while adding the "Leaper" card type. The board is separated into 9 movable tiles with four spaces each except for the start tile with the initial set up of 3x3 square. Besides the Keeper spaces there are 1 octagon space per title and two teleport spaces for the whole board. Moving on to one teleport space allows the player to move to the other teleport space. The octagon may hold any number of pawns while the keeper spaces can only have one with an incoming pawn pushing out the current pawn. There are two peg boards that track, the number of goals needed to win and current rules.

All start with a hand of three cards and a color card in face up to indicate the pawns they control. They each get to make a free rule change. New general rules affecting the tiles include rotation, moving and allowing wraparound tile movement. The game only has Action, Goals, New Rules and Leaper type cards. Action cards can change force a change in player color. A Leaper card counts as a card play but allows you to move a pawn to the item on the board. Goals cards are stacked near the board with top most card the current goal.

Promotional cards
Looney Labs gives away promotional cards related to Fluxx at conventions such as Gen Con and Origins. They have given away cards such as Composting and Jackpot, which later appeared in EcoFluxx and Family Fluxx respectively. They have also given away promo cards for Christmas to members of their online mailing list and in High Times magazine. Game Technicians (previously known as Mad Lab Rabbits), voluntary game demonstrators for Looney Labs, give away promo cards to people interested in the game.

Origins 2000 Goal promo 5 card pack.
 Sir Not Appearing In This Game! for Monty Python Fluxx & its Castle expansion
 Traitor, a Creeper promo card  ) issued for the release of another Looney game, Are You The Traitor?Wizard of Oz song promotional card
"Mrs. Claus" promotional card in Holiday Fluxx store launch kit
"Skullduggery" promo card Pirate  store launch kit
"The Alliance" card Firefly store launch

OnlineFluxx was available to play for free via the Volity network and was also available to be played online via the CCG Workshop, using the gatlingEngine to adjudicate most of its rules automatically. However, both Volity.net and CCG Workshop are no longer operating.

In December 2012, Fluxx was released by Playdek as an app on iOS operating systems (iPhone, iPad, iPod Touch, Apple TV) by purchasing it from the Apple App Store. It uses the "mass market" deck developed for Target Stores, removing some of the more esoteric themes (such as Cthulhu) and complex rule cards.

Reception
The base game won the Mensa Select Game Award in 1999. Rick Loomis comments: "Fluxx makes a good game for a group that has one of those annoying 'I-must-win-every-game' types. The rest of you can enjoy yourselves as the game spins out of his control (as it surely will) and perhaps he'll eventually learn to lose gracefully. Meanwhile, Fluxx will be busily exercising everyone's logic synapses as you attempt to deal with the chaotic situations that occur because of the cheerful clash of rules."

An ICv2 review of the Batman variant by Nick Smith gave it 4 out of 5 stars as "The Fluxx series of games is not for everyone." But the game worked well with the Batman theme: "The game-themed victory conditions are good, and the thematic elements were very well thought out. This may be the best-designed Fluxx set in some time, and it can be a lot of fun for casual fans to try to achieve the thematic victory conditions."

ReviewsPyramid - 3.0

See also
 1000 Blank White Cards
 Looney Labs
 Aquarius Chrononauts Dvorak Mao, another card game with changing rules
 Nomic Treehouse and Icehouse''

References

External links
 , official game site
 
 Fluxx family at Board Game Geek
 The designer explains the Hand Limit rules
 Fully Baked Ideas Official Site, adult versions imprint

Andrew Looney games
Amigo Spiele games
Card games introduced in 1996
Dedicated deck card games
Mensa Select winners